Jayson Swain (born July 27, 1984) is a former American football wide receiver in the NFL and currently a host on his radio show The Swain Event which was named Best of the Best by Cityview Magazine in 2018 ..

High school
Swain was born in Chicago, Illinois, but he attended Virgil I. Grissom High School in Huntsville, Alabama where he was a starter for 4 years in football and 3 years in basketball. He was an All-American and played in the U.S. Army All-American Bowl.  He was recruited by many major Universities as a Senior in High School.

College
Swain garnered rave reviews upon arriving at Tennessee in 2003.  He was part of a heralded recruiting class with receivers Robert Meachem and Bret Smith. As a freshman, Jayson caught 21 passes for 285 yards and was on the Knoxville News Sentinel's All-SEC Freshman Team. Swain started five games in his sophomore and junior seasons, before becoming a full-time starter in the 2006 season. For the 2006 season, Swain had 49 catches and 688 yards receiving and 6 touchdowns. He is currently 6th all-time in UT history with 126 receptions. Swain is also 13th in career receiving yards with 1,721.

NFL
Jayson went undrafted in the 2007 NFL Draft though he was signed as a free agent by the Bears the day after.

References

External links
UTSports.com Bio
UTSports.com Stats
NCAA Official Receiving Statistics

1984 births
Living people
American football wide receivers
Tennessee Volunteers football players
Chicago Bears players
Players of American football from Chicago
Sportspeople from Huntsville, Alabama